Hans Blokland may refer to:

 Hans Blokland (politician) (born 1943), Dutch former Member of the European Parliament
 Hans T. Blokland (born 1960), Dutch social and political theorist